Maurice Daly may refer to:

 Maurice Daly (billiards player), 19th-century American world champion at carom billiards, later a billiards hall and academy operator, tournament sponsor, and billiards author
 Maurice Daly (rugby union) (1914–1994), player of rugby union football, for both Ireland and British East Africa
 Maurice Daly (footballer), Irish international footballer from the 1970s

See also
Maurice Dalé, French footballer